"Love Me" is a song recorded by the Bee Gees, released on the 1976 album Children of the World. It was also included on the compilation albums Bee Gees Greatest and Love from the Bee Gees, which was released only in the UK.

Background
It was written by Barry and Robin Gibb featuring Robin on lead with his vibrato (with Barry on the middle eight evidenced on the outro). This makes this song a curio among the group's latterday tracks, as during the mid and late 1970s, Barry sang most of the group's leads. Robin sings a falsetto lead on the group's 1979 song "Living Together" on the album Spirits Having Flown. He also sang falsetto during the chorus of his solo song "Remedy" from the 1985 album Walls Have Eyes.

With Robin, Barry also sang the lead on the track's middle-eight.

Recording began on 30 March 1976 in Criteria Studios, Miami and finished on 25 April in Le Studio, Quebec, Canada same day as "I Think I'm Losing You" (unreleased).

Yvonne Elliman version

Release
Yvonne Elliman's version was released as a single and reached number 14 in the United States, number six in the United Kingdom, number nine in Ireland, number three in New Zealand and South Africa, number 15 in Australia, number 11 in Canada, and number 16 in Netherlands.

Record World said that it is "Elliman's best outing in some time due to the combination of strong material and an inspired vocal performance."

Charts

Martine McCutcheon version

Background and release
Martine McCutcheon remade "Love Me" for her 1999 debut album, You Me & Us, from which the track—serving as the BBC Children in Need single for 1999—was issued as the third single. It was released as a double A-side single along with "Talking in Your Sleep" on 22 November 1999 and peaked at number six in the United Kingdom.

McCutcheon performed the song at the Children in Need telethon on 26 November 1999. She was supported by 100 children between the age of eight and thirteen, who were selected through nationwide auditions. The successful children had the chance to spend a day in a recording studio with McCutcheon, before serving as backing singers for the song on live television.

Track listing
 "Love Me" (radio mix)- 3:44
 "Talking in Your Sleep" (radio edit) - 4:06

Charts

Other versions
"Love Me" was also recorded by Janie Fricke for her 1981 album Sleeping With Your Memory and cantopop artist Prudence Liew for her 1994 album Thoughts in the Night, Dreams During the Day.

References

1976 singles
1976 songs
1999 singles
Bee Gees songs
Children in Need singles
Innocent Records singles
Martine McCutcheon songs
RSO Records singles
Song recordings produced by Barry Gibb
Song recordings produced by Freddie Perren
Song recordings produced by Maurice Gibb
Song recordings produced by Robin Gibb
Songs written by Barry Gibb
Songs written by Robin Gibb
Virgin Records singles
Yvonne Elliman songs